is a Japanese light novel series written by Yuumikan and illustrated by Koin. It began serialization online in 2016 on the user-generated novel publishing website Shōsetsuka ni Narō. It was acquired by Fujimi Shobo, which published the first light novel volume in September 2017 under their Kadokawa Books imprint. Fifteen volumes have been released as of January 2023.

A manga adaptation with art by Jirō Oimoto has been serialized in Kadokawa Shoten's seinen manga magazine Comp Ace since May 2018, and collected into seven tankōbon volumes. Both the light novel and manga have been licensed in North America by Yen Press. An anime television series adaptation produced by Silver Link aired from January to March 2020. A second season premiered in January 2023.

Plot
Urged on by her friend, Kaede Honjō begins playing the VRMMORPG NewWorld Online under the name Maple. Not wanting to get hurt, Maple opts to be a shield user with maxed-out defense stats, and continues putting every status point she earns in the game into increasing only her defense level. As a result, she is left with slow foot speed and no magic, but her high defense allows her to endure most hits without taking any damage. This, along with her basic-level creative thinking, allows for her to make unexpected accomplishments in the game, its quests and events. By doing this, she ends up earning all kinds of equally unexpected skills and becomes one of the strongest players in the game.

Characters

Maple Tree
 

The main protagonist, who has just started playing NewWorld Online. Since she does not like to get hurt, she puts every skill point she earns into boosting her defense, allowing her to acquire new skills and level up simply by withstanding attacks. Even with her lack of gaming experience, Maple remarkably gains enough resistance to almost anything and seems to have innate luck to locate rare items, hidden dungeons, and unique quests and skills. This gives the game admins many headaches on how to slow her down; to which, her unorthodox methods overcome the developers' adjustments. In the first event, she becomes the third-ranked player after defeating over 2,000 players. During the second event, she finds a monster egg which later hatches into a turtle, which she names Syrup. Due to her high defense, she has been nicknamed "the Walking Fortress" by other players. She is the guild master of Maple Tree.
 

Kaede's real-life friend who introduced her to NewWorld Online. She plays the swashbuckler class, which specializes in evasion and high-speed offense. Risa previously won a championship online game reward; all the trophies in her room, as well as gaming knowledge, hint that she is a pro gamer. She had to join Maple late in the game because her mother forbade her from gaming, wanting her to pass her proficiency exams. She has a strong fear of ghosts; Maple jokes she could not handle haunted houses despite being in-game. During the second event, Sally found a monster egg which later hatches into a fox she named Oboro. After annihilating many players on the final day of the second event, she earned the moniker of "Untouchable Blue Monster".

A samurai whose speed is on par with Sally. She was ranked sixth in the first event. The Flame Emperor guild intended to recruit her, but Maple got to her first. She and the Flame Emperor's Split-Sword Shin have faced each other multiple times in the past and she defeated him every time.

An androgynous male mage player, who specializes in intel gathering and puzzle solving, which allows him to access secret places and items in the game. He uses a Rubik's Cube-like staff called the "Akashic Records," which grants him a random skill each day. He also has a library of spells that he can prepare ahead of time.

A great shielder like Maple and one of the first players that Maple meets in the game. He is recognized as a top player, having ranked ninth in the first event. He usually hangs out with Iz. He later gains the "Undead Lord" gear after soloing a hidden dungeon designed for players who have died and revived a certain number of times. He is usually involved in the game chat where the chat presses him for information about Maple. It is implied he is the oldest among the guild as he states he has to act as the girls' big brother and protector just to make sure no one takes advantage of them.

A crafter who creates made-to-order equipment. She becomes the guilds crafter, but still accepts private commissions. Being in the guild inspires her to craft unique gear, an opportunity she never was given originally. She usually hangs out with Kuromu. In battle, she specializes in demolition equipping herself with various explosives; she also uses a pickaxe for close range.

A rookie player who, unlike Maple, put all of her skill points into strength instead. This allows her to wield heavy weapons and deal maximum damage. She wears a green ribbon in her black hair and wields two giant hammers with the same color scheme. Much of her skills are earned in boss rushes and time trials.

Mai's younger sister, who put all of her skill points into strength, much like Mai. Her hair is white with a pink ribbon and her hammers are also the same color as her hair. Like her twin sister, her skills are earned through boss rushes and time trials, which allows her to wield heavier weapons and deal maximum damage.

Maple's turtle familiar, whose egg was rewarded to her after Maple and Sally defeated the Silverwing boss. After the second event, Maple uses her rewards to allow Syrup to grow in size using the Metamorph skill, as well as fly by means of Maple equipping herself with the Psychokinesis skill. Ironically, Syrup's mobility is far superior than Maple due to her zero agility. Syrup is used as the guild's form of transportation as a flying fortress. It can only say the word .

Sally's fox familiar, whose egg was rewarded to her after Maple and Sally defeated the Silverwing boss. Oboro specializes in speed and fire spells. She also has the ability to split Sally into shadow clones.

Order of the Holy Sword

A swordsman who is the Order of the Holy Sword's guild master and NewWorld Onlines top player with the highest level in the game.

An assassin type and the second-ranked player in the first event. Like Sally, he acts as a high speed attacker.

A magician and one of the first users Maple meets in the game, giving Maple advice on how to level up. She later develops a friendly rivalry with Sally. She is also the guild's information gatherer.

A warrior type axeman who is the fifth-ranked player in the first event. He excels in brute force attacks.

Flame Emperor

Nicknamed "Flame Empress", she is a high ranking mage and the Flame Emperor's guild master. She is considered one of the most powerful and charismatic players and one of the few players who could compete with Payne in combat. While she usually acts cool and confident, she became flustered after being beaten by Maple.

Nicknamed "Split-Sword", due to his special skill of splitting his sword's blade into multiple projectiles. He fought Kasumi several times in the past and lost. Originally, he wanted to recruit her to the Flame Emperor, but Maple recruited her first.

The guild's Trap Master.

The healer of the Guild. She is popular within the guild for her skill and beauty.

NewWorld Online (NWO)
The Administrators
A boardroom consisting of developers, designers, and programmers. This group is constantly driven crazy by Maple's shenanigans and describe her as "more of a last boss than their last boss". They constantly struggle to make adjustments to compensate for Maple, only to be thwarted by her unorthodox strategies and creative playstyle as well as her absurdly good luck.

NewWorld Onlines little dragon mascot exclusive to the anime, who acts as host to the various player events.

Media

Light novels
The series originally began on the user-generated novel publishing website Shōsetsuka ni Narō by Yuumikan in 2016, being viewed more than 60 million times on the site. The following year, the series was acquired by publisher Fujimi Shobo to be published as a light novel with illustrations by Koin on the Kadokawa Books imprint, with the first volume being released in September 2017. The light novel is licensed in North America by Yen Press.

Manga
A manga adaptation by Jirō Oimoto began serialization on the seinen magazine Comp Ace by publisher Kadokawa Shoten in May 2018. The manga is also licensed by Yen Press.

Anime
An anime adaptation was announced by Kadokawa on December 6, 2018. The series was animated by Silver Link, and directed by Shin Oonuma and Mirai Minato, with Fumihiko Shimo handling series composition, and Kazuya Hirata designing the characters. The series aired from January 8 to March 25, 2020, on AT-X, ABC, Tokyo MX, TVA, and BS11. Afilia Saga performed the opening theme , while Rico Sasaki performed the ending theme "Play the World." It ran for 12 episodes.

Funimation had licensed the series for a SimulDub. Following Sony's acquisition of Crunchyroll, the series was moved to Crunchyroll. Muse Communication streamed the series on its Muse Asia YouTube channel in Southeast Asia and South Asia. 

A second season of the anime was announced at the end of the first season's final episode, and was originally scheduled to air in 2022, but was later delayed. It premiered on January 11, 2023. Junjō no Afilia performed the opening theme , while FRAM performed the ending theme "Step for Joy".

On February 13, 2023, the official anime website announced the seventh episode of the season and beyond would be delayed by two weeks till March 8, 2023.

Episode list

Season 1

Season 2

Reception
The web novel version of the story on Shōsetsuka ni Narō has over 60 million views since its original publication on the site.

Notes

References

External links
  at Shōsetsuka ni Narō 
  
  
 

2017 Japanese novels
2020 anime television series debuts
Anime and manga based on light novels
Anime postponed due to the COVID-19 pandemic
AT-X (TV network) original programming
Crunchyroll anime
Fujimi Shobo
Kadokawa Dwango franchises
Kadokawa Shoten manga
Light novels
Light novels first published online
Massively multiplayer online role-playing games in fiction
Muse Communication
School life in anime and manga
Seinen manga
Shōsetsuka ni Narō
Silver Link
Yen Press titles